Alfred Boy Njuguna (date of birth unknown) is a Kenyan former first-class cricketer and coach of the Kenya national cricket team.

Njuguna represented Kenya in three editions of the ICC Trophy between 1986 and 1994, making seventeen appearances. In the latter, Kenya gained qualification to the 1996 World Cup, but Njuguna was not part of the Kenya squad for their inaugural world cup. He also made one appearance in first-class cricket for Kenya against the touring Pakistan Starlets at Nairobi in 1986. Batting twice in the match, he was dismissed in the Kenyan first innings without scoring by Sajjad Akbar, while in their second innings he was dismissed for 21 runs by the same bowler. With the ball, he took the wicket of Rizwan-uz-Zaman in the Starlets first innings. After his playing career, Njuguna moved into coaching and was appointed head coach of Kenya by Cricket Kenya in March 2005, replacing Mudassar Nazar. He held the post until 2006. Following his spell as Kenya coach, he was critical of the way cricket in Kenya was governed, but did praise the actions of the Nairobi Provincial Cricket Association in 2021 for taking action resolve to resolve the internal leadership disputes which have been ongoing in Cricket Kenya for over a decade.

References

External links

Living people
Kenyan cricketers
Kenyan cricket coaches
Coaches of the Kenya national cricket team
Year of birth missing (living people)